Lanie Lane (born 11 February 1987) is the stage name of Lanier Stefanie Myra Johnston, an Australian blues-jazz singer-songwriter and guitarist. Lane released two studio albums between 2011 and 2014. At the ARIA Music Awards of 2012, Lane was nominated for five awards. In February 2015, Lane announced she was "quitting" the music industry.

Lane used a 1957 guitar named Betty, a 1966 electric Gibson named BoDidd (after Bo Diddley) and an unnamed 1960 archtop guitar. The album track, "Betty Baby", is dedicated to the guitar.

Biography

1987–2009: Early Years

Lanie (pronounced "Lannie") Lane was born on 11 February 1987 as Lanier Stefanie Myra Johnston and grew up in Sydney.

2010–2013: To the Horses

On 24 September 2010, she issued her debut single, "What Do I Do", which was the theme song for the Australian Broadcasting Corporation TV series, Crownies from July to December 2011.

In February 2011, Lane recorded the majority of her debut album. In August 2011, Lane released her first vinyl single, the double-A sided "Ain't Hungry"/"My Man". In August 2011, Lane recorded "(Oh Well) That's What You Get (Falling in Love with a Cowboy)". According to Lane the track is a result of somniloquy, "I woke up one morning and my boyfriend said, 'You said the weirdest thing in your sleep last night'. He told me and said you'd better write a song about it. I wrote the song and he said, 'Well, that's one side of the story'".

Lane's debut album, To the Horses, was self-produced, released on Ivy League Records in October 2011 and it peaked at No. 12 on the ARIA Albums Chart.

In February 2012 she opened for Icehouse and Hall & Oates at a Day on the Green performance.

In March 2012, Lane covered The Black Keys' track, "Gold on the Ceiling", for Triple J's program, Like a Version.

At the APRA Music Awards of 2012, Lane was nominated for four awards. Her song "(Oh Well) That's What You Get (Falling in Love with a Cowboy)" was performed by Kram (Spiderbait). At the ARIA Music Awards of 2012, Lane was nominated for five awards. To the Horses was certified gold in Australia in 2013.

2014–2015: Night Shade to quitting music

In August 2014, Lane released "Celeste" the lead single from her second studio album, Night Shade, which was released in October 2014. Night Shade peaked at number 42 on the ARIA Charts.

In February 2015, Lane announced she's quitting the music industry indefinitely, admitting the "rock n roll lifestyle is no longer for me". In a lengthy statement, Lane said her love of creating, writing and playing music is still a "true joy" but the ambition for fame and attention in the industry is "completely" gone.

Discography

Studio albums

Extended plays

Singles

Awards and nominations

AIR Awards
The Australian Independent Record Awards (commonly known informally as AIR Awards) is an annual awards night to recognise, promote and celebrate the success of Australia's Independent Music sector.

|-
| 2012 
|To the Horses 
| Best Independent Blues and Roots Album
|

APRA Awards
The APRA Awards is an awards event, presented annually since 1982 by the Australasian Performing Right Association (APRA), "honouring composers and songwriters". Lane has been nominated for five awards.

|-
| rowspan="4"| 2012 || rowspan="2"|"(Oh Well) That's What You Get (Falling in Love with a Cowboy)" (Lanie Lane) || Blues & Roots Work of the Year || 
|-
| Song of the Year || 
|-
| "What Do I Do" (Lanie Lane) || Blues & Roots Work of the Year || 
|-
| Lanie Lane || Breakthrough Songwriter of the Year || 
|-
| rowspan="2"| 2013 || "The Devil's Sake" (Lanie Lane) || Blues & Roots Work of the Year || 
|-
| "Like Me Meaner" (Lanie Lane) || Blues & Roots Work of the Year ||

ARIA Music Awards
The ARIA Music Awards is an annual awards ceremony that recognises excellence, innovation, and achievement across all genres of Australian music. Lane has been nominated for five awards.

|-
| rowspan="5"| 2012
| rowspan="3"| To the Horses
| Best Female Artist
| 
|-
| Best Blues & Roots Album
| 
|-
| Breakthrough Artist - Release
| 
|-
| Lanie Lane for To the Horses
| Producer of the Year
| 
|-
| "(Oh Well) That's What You Get (Falling in Love with a Cowboy)"
| Best Video
| 
|-

EG Awards
The EG Awards) are an annual awards night celebrating Victorian music. 

|-
| EG Awards of 2012
|herself
| Best Female 
|

J Award
The J Awards are an annual series of Australian music awards that were established by the Australian Broadcasting Corporation's youth-focused radio station Triple J. They commenced in 2005.

|-
| J Awards of 2011
|herself
| Unearthed Artist of the Year
|

References

1987 births
Living people
Blues singers
21st-century Australian singers
21st-century Australian women singers